Winfield Peak is a mountain summit of the Collegiate Peaks in the Sawatch Range of the Rocky Mountains of North America.  The  summit is located in Chaffee County, Colorado, U.S., two miles north of the ghost town of Winfield.

Historical names
Middle Mountain
Mount Winfield
Winfield Peak – 1981

See also

List of Colorado mountain ranges
List of Colorado mountain summits
List of Colorado fourteeners
List of Colorado 4000 meter prominent summits
List of the most prominent summits of Colorado
List of Colorado county high points

References

External links

Mountains of Colorado
Mountains of Chaffee County, Colorado
North American 3000 m summits